Lough Acoose is a freshwater lake in the southwest of Ireland. It is located on the Iveragh Peninsula of County Kerry near the MacGillycuddy's Reeks mountains.

Geography

Natural history
Fish present in Lough Acoose include brown trout, Arctic char, salmon and the critically endangered European eel. Lough Acoose is part of the Killarney National Park, MacGillycuddy's Reeks and Caragh River Catchment Special Area of Conservation.

See also
List of loughs in Ireland

References

Acoose